In molecular biology, glycoside hydrolase family 38 is a family of glycoside hydrolases.

Glycoside hydrolases  are a widespread group of enzymes that hydrolyse the glycosidic bond between two or more carbohydrates, or between a carbohydrate and a non-carbohydrate moiety. A classification system for glycoside hydrolases, based on sequence similarity, has led to the definition of >100 different families. This classification is available on the CAZy web site, and also discussed at CAZypedia, an online encyclopedia of carbohydrate active enzymes.

Glycoside hydrolase family 38 CAZY GH_38 comprises enzymes with only one known activity; alpha-mannosidase.

Lysosomal alpha-mannosidase is necessary for the catabolism of N-linked carbohydrates released during glycoprotein turnover. The enzyme catalyzes the hydrolysis of terminal, non-reducing alpha-D-mannose residues in alpha-D-mannosides, and can cleave all known types of alpha-mannosidic linkages. Defects in the gene cause lysosomal alpha-mannosidosis (AM), a lysosomal storage disease characterised by the accumulation of unbranched oligo-saccharide chains.

A domain, which is found in the central region adopts a structure consisting of three alpha helices, in an immunoglobulin/albumin-binding domain-like fold. The domain is predominantly found in the enzyme alpha-mannosidase.

References 

EC 3.2.1
GH family
Protein families